Paeonian, sometimes spelled Paionian, is a poorly attested, extinct language spoken by the ancient Paeonians until late antiquity.

Paeonia once stretched north of Macedon, into Dardania, and in earlier times into southwestern Thrace.

Classification

Classical sources usually considered the Paeonians distinct from the rest of the Paleo-Balkan people, comprising their own ethnicity and language. It is considered a Paleo-Balkan language but this is only a geographical grouping, not a genealogical one. Modern linguists are uncertain as to the classification of Paeonian, due to the extreme scarcity of surviving materials in the language, with numerous hypotheses having been published:

 Wilhelm Tomaschek and Paul Kretschmer have put forward an “Illyrian” hypothesis (i.e a part of the linguistic complex of the ancient north-western Balkans) which, according to Radoslav Katičić, seems to be the prevailing opinion.
Dimitar Dečev and Susan Wise Bauer proposed a Thracian hypothesis.
Francesco Villari proposed a Thraco-Illyrian hypothesis.
 Karl Beloch, Ioannis Svoronos and Irwin L. Merker consider Paeonian an ancient Greek dialect (or a lost Indo-European language  very closely related to Greek, i.e Hellenic) with a great deal of Thracian and Illyrian influence.
 Vladimir I. Georgiev suggested a Phrygian affiliation.
 Athenaeus seems to have connected the Paeonian language to the Mysian language, which was possibly a member of the Anatolian languages, or of the Armeno-Phrygian languages.
Radoslav Katičić has said that “we know so little about their language that any linguistic affiliation seems meaningless”.

Paeonian vocabulary

Several Paeonian words are known from classical sources:

monapos, the European bison
tilôn, a species of fish once found in Lake Prasias
, a species of fish once found in Lake Prasias. , masc. acc. pl.

A number of anthroponyms (some known only from Paeonian coinage) are attested: ,

German , "wet", Middle Irish  "salmon", Sanskrit  "mud, mire", Greek  "passage", "way");
  (nowadays near Gevgelija), name of a city (cf. Greek Idomeneus, proper name in Homer, "Ida", mountain in Crete);
Old Prussian  "rock", Old Church Slavonic , "pillar", Old English , "post", Ancient Greek , "scolding, bad language");
Greek  "difficult", and "oros" Greek , "mountain");
 , name of a tribe, possibly from  "field" (cf. Lat. , Grc.  , Eng. acre) with cognates in the Greek tribe of Agraioi who lived in Aetolia, and the name of the month Agrianos which is found throughout the Dorian and Aeolian worlds.

References

Francisco Villar. Gli Indoeuropei e le origini dell'Europa. Il Mulino, 1997. 

Paleo-Balkan languages
Hellenic languages
Illyrian languages
Thracian language
Thraco-Illyrian
Languages of ancient Macedonia
Languages extinct in the 4th century
Unclassified languages of Europe
Unclassified Indo-European languages
Varieties of Ancient Greek